Liwan (from Persian ) is a long narrow-fronted hall or vaulted portal in ancient and modern Levantine homes that is often open to the outside.

In its simplest form, the history of the liwan dates back more than 2,000 years, when the liwan house was essentially a covered terrace, supported by retaining walls, with a courtyard in front.

In its more complex forms, the liwan house is composed of a large ceremonial entrance hall (liwan) at the front of the complex, divided into three sections, and flanked by two smaller liwans. The back of the house opens onto a columned peristyle courtyard from which the main room and the private apartments opposite can be accessed, with symmetry on either side of the central axis.

Mats and carpets are typically spread along the length of the floor of the liwan, and the mattresses and cushions along the length of the walls make up the diwan or divan seating area.

Types of liwan houses

Three-arched house or Central Hall House
One type of liwan house is the three-arched house or "Central Hall House", as coined by Friedrich Ragette in 1974. It is also known as the "traditional house" or "Late-Ottoman Arab House" in Haifa or the "Beiruti House" in Mersin.

The 19th-century Levantine model of the three-arched house with many regional variations is found in the coastal regions of Lebanon, Syria, Palestine, Israel and Turkey. A representative example of the liwan house commonly found in towns throughout the West Bank and Gaza is the Al Imam house in Hebron.

See also

Iwan
Hosh (architecture)

References

Bibliography

Islamic architecture
Islamic architectural elements
Arabic architecture
Ottoman architecture
House types
Architecture in Syria
Architecture in the State of Palestine
Architecture in Lebanon